League City is a city in the U.S. state of Texas, in Galveston County, within the  metropolitan area.  As of the 2020 census, the city had a population of 112,129.

The city of League City has a small portion north of Clear Creek within Harris County zoned for residential and commercial uses. It is home to several waterside resorts, such as South Shore Harbor Resort and Conference Center and Waterford Harbor and Yacht Club Marina, popular with residents of nearby Houston. Between 2000 and 2005, League City surpassed Galveston as Galveston County's largest city.

History

League City was settled at the former site of a Karankawa Indian village. Three families, the Butlers, the Cowarts, and the Perkinses, are considered to be founding families of the city. The Winfield Family has also recently been acknowledged as a founding family by the City Government. The Cowart family settled on a creek now called Cowart's Creek after them (now often called "Coward's Creek"). The Perkins family built on a creek notably lined with magnolia trees and named it Magnolia Bayou. The Butler family settled inland. The Winfield Family purchased land in League City from the great nephew of Stephen F. Austin and moved there, to a place near what is now Hobbs Road.

The first resident of the town proper, George W. Butler, arrived from Louisiana in 1854 and settled at the junction of Clear Creek and Chigger Bayou. The area was known as Butler's Ranch or Clear Creek until J. C. League acquired the land from a man named Muldoon on his entering the priesthood. League laid out his townsite along the Galveston, Houston, and Henderson Railroad, already established in the area. This began a small feud over the name, as Butler was the postmaster. The name was changed several times, alternating between Clear Creek and the new League City. In the end, League City was chosen.

In 1907, League had two railroad flatcars of live oak trees left by the railroad tracks. These were for the residents to plant on their property. Butler and his son Milby supervised the planting of these trees, now known as the Butler Oaks. Many of them line Main Street to this day.

Starting in the early 1970s, the bodies of 30 murdered women were discovered in League City, and more have gone missing from the same area. This location has become known as the Texas Killing Fields.

In the 2000s, rising real estate costs in Galveston forced many families to move to other areas, including League City. This meant an influx of children out of Galveston ISD and into other school districts like Clear Creek ISD and Dickinson ISD.

Geography

Climate
As with the rest of the Houston area, League City features a humid subtropical climate  characterized by hot, humid summers and generally mild winters (corresponding to Cfa in Köppen Climate Classification).

Demographics

As of the 2020 United States census, there were 114,392 people, 37,662 households, and 27,546 families residing in the city.

As of the census of 2010, there were 83,560 people, 30,192 households, and 22,544 families residing in the city. The population density was 1,596 people per square mile (616.2/km2). There were 32,119 housing units at an average density of 627.3 per square mile (241.9/km2). The racial makeup of the city was 79.5% White, 7.1% Black or African American, 0.4% Native American, 5.4% Asian, 0.1% Pacific Islander, 4.7% some other race, and 2.9% from two or more races. Hispanic or Latino of any race were 17.3% of the population.

There were 30,192 households, out of which 40.4% had children under the age of 18 living with them, 60.3% were headed by married couples living together, 10.2% had a female householder with no husband present, and 25.3% were non-families. 20.3% of all households were made up of individuals, and 3.8% had someone living alone who was 65 years of age or older. The average household size was 2.75 and the average family size was 3.20.

In the city, the population was distributed with 28.5% under the age of 18, 7.3% from 18 to 24, 31.6% from 25 to 44, 25.3% from 45 to 64, and 7.3% who were 65 years of age or older. The median age was 34.5 years. For every 100 females, there were 96.6 males. For every 100 females age 18 and over, there were 94.4 males.

According to the 2019 American Community Survey estimate, the median income for a household in the city was $115,650, and the median income for a family was $130,293. The per capita income for the city was $46,539. About 1.6% of the population were below the poverty line, including 7.0% of those under age 18 and 5.8% of those age 65 or over.

Arts and culture

Public library

The Helen Hall Library, a member of the Galveston County Library System, is operated by the city and located at 100 West Walker Street. The League City Public Library was renamed after Hall in 1985. During that year a $2.5 million bond to expand the  library passed. The library received a two-story adult services wing and a renovation of the original structure, which housed the children's and audio-visual services sections; the projects were completed by 1988.

Circa 2019 the library's history club began operations. It meets once per month. As of 2021, according to the librarian specializing in history, Caris Brown, the history club had a number of people going to meetings despite the effect of the COVID-19 pandemic in Texas.

In 2022 two League City city council members created a resolution which would have a board of 15 people decide whether content is obscene, and if so, prevent the library from having tax dollars to house said material ruled obscene.

Parks and recreation
The  Perry Family YMCA is located at 1701 League City Parkway. The branch, which cost US$10.7 million to build was named after Bob Perry, a homebuilder who donated $1 million. The North Galveston County YMCA began in 1993 and later moved into the Perry YMCA. John P. McGovern and his wife, Katherine, donated the  site used for the Perry YMCA.

Hometown Heroes Park is a public community park covering 28.71 acres that includes a recreation center, basketball/volleyball courts, competition size swimming pool, and sports fields.

Government

League City became an incorporated city in 1962.  League City's government consists of seven council members and the mayor. The mayor is a full voting member of the council.  The City's charter is purported to be a strong mayor form of government, but this issue has been debated for years.  By ordinance, a city administrator position was created under Mayor Leonard Cruse. The ordinance was amended in May 2010 to create a council-manager government. According to the ordinance, "...shall consist of a mayor and council members, elected by the people and responsible to the people, and a city manager, appointed by and responsible to the council for proper administration of the affairs of the city."

In 2011 an officer accused the police chief, Michael Jez, of giving officers ticket quotas, which are illegal in the state of Texas.  In November city council voted to place Chief Jez on administrative leave.  The council did not give a reason and Jez cited philosophical differences for the separation.  Much speculation was made that the decision was a reaction to the allegation made, but neither side ever admitted to any wrongdoing.

In 2014, the police department moved to a new joint Public Safety Building that is shared with Police and Fire administration as well as housing the police department, dispatch, and the city jail.  The building is across the street from the old police department that now houses other city offices that were previously in leased space.  The city held an open house in January 2015 to serve as a grand opening to the public, allowing citizens to come see the inner workings of the police department.

Education

Primary and secondary schools

Public schools

Clear Creek Independent School District is based in League City, and serves pupils in the Harris County portion and most of the Galveston County portion. Most pupils in League City attend schools in the Clear Creek Independent School District.

CCISD was established in 1948, partly from the former League City school district. League City Elementary School, Ferguson Elementary School, and Hyde Elementary School are primary schools located in League City. League City Intermediate, Clear Creek Intermediate, and Creekside Intermediate are middle schools located in the city.

Clear Creek High School is located in League City. In 2007, Clear Springs High School opened in western League City. In 2010, Clear Falls High School opened in southeastern League City.

School districts serving other portions of League City in Galveston County include Dickinson Independent School District and Santa Fe Independent School District. Within League City Dickinson ISD operates Bay Colony Elementary School, Calder Road Elementary School, Louis G. Lobit Elementary School, and Eva C. Lobit Middle School. The respective comprehensive high schools of the two school districts are Dickinson High School and Santa Fe High School.

Private schools
Bay Area Christian School started in 1973 and currently has an enrollment of over 800 students from grades K to 12.

St. Mary School, a Roman Catholic K–8 school operated by the Roman Catholic Archdiocese of Galveston-Houston, is in League City.

Colleges and universities
The Galveston County portion of Clear Creek ISD and Dickinson ISD (and therefore all parts of League City in Galveston County) are served by the College of the Mainland. The Harris County portion of Clear Creek ISD (and therefore the Harris County portion of League City) is served by San Jacinto College.

It is also located within a few miles of the University of Houston Clear Lake.

Infrastructure

Transportation
Houston Gulf Airport was located in eastern League City. The airport's land was sold and the land became a string of houses along Texas State Highway 96.  The airport was once partially owned by the Bin Laden family with Salem Bin Laden holding interest in the airport at least until his death in 1988.

Commercial airline service for the area is operated from George Bush Intercontinental Airport and William P. Hobby Airport, which are located in Houston.
League City in conjunction with Island Transit, Connect Transit, and UTMB, there is now a Park and Ride in the Victory Lakes subdivision.

Health care

Notable people
 Maddie Baillio, actress and singer
 Jarred Cosart, baseball player
 Busby Family, family of the first-ever all-female quintuplets born in the United States
 Doug Hurley, NASA astronaut
 Karen Nyberg, NASA astronaut
 Marcus Johnson, American football player

See also

Galveston Bay Area

Notes

References

External links
 City of League City official website
 

 
Cities in Texas
Cities in Harris County, Texas
Galveston Bay Area
Greater Houston
Cities in Galveston County, Texas
Populated coastal places in Texas